Night Song is an album by Norwegian pianist Ketil Bjørnstad and Swedish cellist Svante Henryson recorded in Norway in 2009 and released on the ECM label.

Reception
The All About Jazz review by John Kelman said that "Defined by stark simplicity and a quiet majesty powered more by calm than energy, both Bjørnstad and Henryson value the purity of every note, and the resultant overtones when permitted decay to their inevitable conclusion. Neither seems compelled to speak more than is absolutely necessary, their discretion and unfailing choices defining qualities that allow Night Song'''s 16 original compositions (all but four by Bjørnstad) no shortage of interpretive unpredictability, despite never losing sight of—or respect for—the essence of each piece".

Track listingAll compositions by Ketil Bjørnstad except as indicated''
 "Night Song (Evening Version)" - 4:31   
 "Visitor" - 5:11   
 "Fall" (Svante Henryson) - 3:29   
 "Edge" - 5:39   
 "Reticence" (Henryson) - 5:44   
 "Schubert Said" - 4:36   
 "Adoro" - 6:26   
 "Share" - 4:26   
 "Melting Ice" (Henryson) - 3:25   
 "Serene"  - 6:02   
 "The Other"  - 4:08   
 "Own" - 3:15   
 "Sheen"  - 5:45   
 "Chain" - 6:19   
 "Tar" (Henryson) - 3:02   
 "Night Song (Morning Version)"  - 5:00

Personnel
Ketil Bjørnstad - piano
Svante Henryson - cello

References

2011 albums
ECM Records albums
Ketil Bjørnstad albums
Albums produced by Manfred Eicher